+incinerate is the third EP by Sphere Lazza, released in 1994 by Arts Industria.

Music 
The song "Justified?" had previously been released on the Cyberchrist EP and on the various artists compilations Blood and Computers II: The Return of the Cyberpunks by Paradise Movement and Electro Industrial Assassins by Cleopatra Records in 1995. The song "Kiss the Serpent" was released on 1994's compilation Transatlantic Techno Trip by Electro Pulse. Four tracks from +incinerate were remastered and released with most of the band's Cyberchrist EP on the band's 1995 compilation album Incinerate, released in 1995 by Fifth Colvmn Records.

Reception 
Sonic Boom said +incinerate has "a unique sound quite its own" and said "stylistically this album approaches Noise Unit in programming and vocal mixing.."

Track listing

Personnel 
Adapted from the +incinerate liner notes.

Sphere Lazza
 Tony Spaz – instruments, production
 David Trousdale – vocals, production

Production and design
 Arts Industria – cover art, illustrations, design

Release history

References

External links 
 +incinerate at Discogs (list of releases)
 +incinerate at iTunes

1994 EPs
Sphere Lazza albums